Ādityahṛudayam is a Hindu devotional hymn dedicated to Āditya or Sūrya (the Sun God) found in the Yuddha Kānda (6.105) of Vālmīki's Rāmāyana. It was recited by the sage Agastya to Rāma in the battlefield before fighting with the Rakshasa king Rāvaṇa. In it, Agastya teaches Rāma the procedure of worshiping Āditya ( for strength ) to defeat the enemy.

Etymology
Āditya (lit. "son of Aditi") refers to the Sun. Hṛdayam is the Sanskrit word for 'heart'''.

 Structure 

The Ādityahṛdayam is made up of thirty śhloka''s which can be divided into six sections:

Text

See also
 Gayatri Mantra

References

Related links 

Ramayana
Hindu music
Hindu devotional texts
Sanskrit texts